Hypercompe perplexa is a moth of the family Erebidae first described by William Schaus in 1911. It is found in Costa Rica.

References

Hypercompe
Moths described in 1911